Musician, Composer, Raconteur is a live album by trumpeter Dizzy Gillespie recorded at the Montreux Jazz Festival in 1981 and released on the Pablo label.

Reception
The Allmusic review stated "This double album is subtitled "Dizzy Gillespie Plays and Raps in His Greatest Concert," an exaggeration to say the least. In reality, this set (which contains some of his humorous joking with the audience) is a fine all-around example of Gillespie at a typical concert in 1981. At the age of 63, he was no longer the powerful trumpeter he once was, but he still had something to contribute".

Track listing
All compositions by Dizzy Gillespie except as indicated

Disc One:
 Introduction of the band by Claude Nobs - 1:23 
 "Manteca" (Gil Fuller, Gillespie, Chano Pozo) - 7:55 
 Dizzy Rapping with the Audience - 2:30 
 "Con Alma" - 15:07 
 Introduction of Milt Jackson by Dizzy - 1:49 
 "SKJ" (Milt Jackson) - 6:07 
 Dizzy Rapping with the Audience - 0:52 
 "A Night in Tunisia" (Gillespie, Felix Paparelli) - 17:22 
Disc Two: 
 Introduction of the band by Dizzy - 1:33 
 "Brother King" - 9:09 
 "Body and Soul" (Frank Eyton, Johnny Green, Edward Heyman, Robert Sour) - 7:26 
 "Tanga" - 3:06 
 "Olinga" - 16:13

Personnel
Dizzy Gillespie - trumpet, vocals
James Moody - tenor saxophone, alto saxophone, flute
Milt Jackson - vibraphone
Ed Cherry - guitar
Michael Howell - bass
George Hughes - drums

References 

1982 live albums
Pablo Records live albums
Dizzy Gillespie live albums
Albums recorded at the Montreux Jazz Festival